Oriane Messina is a British comedy writer and performer, best known for her work in the sketch show Smack the Pony and the sitcom Green Wing. She has had a working partnership with fellow writer Fay Rusling since 1999. In 2007, she appeared briefly as a nurse in sitcom Not Going Out, and again briefly in 2008 as a driving tester in The Inbetweeners.

Performer 

Green Wing (2004–2007) Playing several roles.
Speeding in Channel 4's Comedy Lab (2005) Playing Louise.
The Inbetweeners (2008) Playing the driving tester.

Writer 

Smack the Pony (1999–2003)
2DTV – (2001–2004) (as Orianne Messina)
Green Wing (2004–2007)
Speeding in Channel 4's Comedy Lab (2005)
Campus (2009–2011)
Me and Mrs Jones (TV series) (2012) (also creator)
Brief Encounters (TV series) (2016) (also creator)
Breeders (2020–2021)

Radio 

Bearded Ladies – (2005) (presenter, writer and performer)

External links 
Oriane Messina in BBC Comedy Guide
Orianne Messina in BBC Comedy Guide
Green Wing "microsite" at Channel4.com
British Sitcom Guide Green Wing writers.

British comedy writers
Living people
Year of birth missing (living people)
People educated at St Benedict's School, Ealing